The T.25 or Type 25 is a city car designed by Gordon Murray, who created the McLaren F1 supercar. The car made its first public appearance on June 28, 2010 at the UK's Smith School of Enterprise and the Environment in Oxford.

Description
The centralized driving position is also a feature of Murray's iconic McLaren F1; central instrumentation and controls are borrowed from Formula One. It is a three-seater car with a rear-mounted three-cylinder petrol engine. From the details released by its designer Murray, three T.25s can be parked in one standard UK parallel parking space, thereby increasing much needed urban parking capacity; in addition, its compact size will allow two T.25s to travel side-by-side (theoretically) in one UK motorway lane.

An electric version, called the T.27, was unveiled in June 2011.

Autocar Magazine Reported in August 2013 that the Murray T25 and T27 were confirmed for production, that the city cars project had been sold to a manufacturer, and were estimated to be launched in 2016. As of 2022, this launch had still not occurred.

References

External links

Concept cars
City cars
Cars of England